Mac OS X 10.1 (code named Puma) is the second major release of macOS, Apple's desktop and server operating system. It superseded Mac OS X 10.0 and preceded Mac OS X Jaguar. Mac OS X 10.1 was released on September 25, 2001, as a free update for Mac OS X 10.0 users. 
The operating system was handed out for no charge by Apple employees after Steve Jobs' keynote speech at the Seybold publishing conference in San Francisco. It was subsequently distributed to Mac users on October 25, 2001, at Apple Stores and other retail stores that carried Apple products.

System requirements
Supported computers:
Power Mac G3
Power Mac G4
Power Mac G4 Cube
iMac G3
eMac
PowerBook G3, except for the original PowerBook G3
PowerBook G4
iBook
RAM:
128 megabytes (MB) (unofficially 64 MB minimum)
Hard Drive Space:
1.5 gigabytes (GB)

Features
Apple introduced many features that were missing from the previous version, as well as improving overall system performance.

This system release brought some major new features to the Mac OS X platform:
Performance enhancements — Mac OS X 10.1 introduced large performance increases throughout the system.
Easier CD and DVD burning — better support in Finder as well as in iTunes
DVD playback support — DVDs can be played in Apple DVD Player
More printer support (200 printers supported out of the box) — One of the main complaints of version 10.0 users was the lack of printer drivers, and Apple attempted to remedy the situation by including more drivers, although many critics complained that there were still not enough.
Faster 3D (OpenGL performs 20% faster) — The OpenGL drivers and handling were vastly improved in this version of Mac OS X, which created a large performance gap for 3D elements in the interface, and 3D applications.
Improved AppleScript — The scripting interface now allows scripting access to many more system components, such as the Printer Center, and Terminal, thus improving the customizability of the interface. As well, Apple introduced AppleScript Studio, which allows a user to create full AppleScript applications in a simple graphical interface.
Improved filehandling - The Finder was enhanced to optionally hide file extensions on a per-file basis. The Cocoa API was enhanced to allow developers to set traditional Mac type and creator information directly without relying on Carbon to do it.
ColorSync 4.0, the color management system and API.
Image Capture, for acquiring images from digital cameras and scanners.
Menu Extras, a set of items the user can add to the system menu, replacing the supplied Dock Extras from Mac OS X 10.0 Cheetah.

Apple switched to using Mac OS X as the default on all then-new Macs with the 10.1.2 release.

Applications found on Mac OS X 10.1 Puma

Address Book
AppleScript
Calculator
Chess
Clock
CPU Monitor
DVD Player
Image Capture
iMovie
Internet Connect
Internet Explorer for Mac
iTunes
Mail
Preview
Process Viewer (now Activity Monitor)
QuickTime Player
Sherlock
Stickies
System Preferences
StuffIt Expander
TextEdit
Terminal

Release history

Timeline

References

External links
Mac OS X v10.1 review at Ars Technica
 from apple.com
 from apple.com

	

1
PowerPC operating systems
2001 software
Computer-related introductions in 2001